{{safesubst:#invoke:RfD|||month = March
|day = 18
|year = 2023
|time = 15:38
|timestamp = 20230318153830

|content=
REDIRECT Tom Atkins (actor)

}}